The Dumaresq River ; (Indigenous Bigambul: Karaula) a perennial stream of the Macintyre catchment within the Murray–Darling basin, is located in the Northern Tablelands and North West Slopes regions of New South Wales and the Darling Downs region of Queensland, Australia.

Part of the course of the river marks the boundary between Queensland and New South Wales.

Course and features
The river rises on the western slopes of the Great Dividing Range, formed by the confluence of the Queensland branch of the Severn River and the Tenterfield Creek, east of Glenlyon Dam in Queensland. The upper reaches of the Dumaresq River form north of Stanthorpe, Queensland. The Dumaresq River flows generally southwest and northwest, joined by fourteen tributaries, including the Mole River, Pike Creek, Beardy River, and Macintyre Brook, before reaching its confluence with the Macintyre River, east of Boggabilla. The river descends  over its  course.

The Dumaresq River, together with Pike Creek, the Mole, Beardy, Severn (Queensland), Severn (New South Wales), and Macintyre rivers are all part of the Border Rivers group. The Dumaresq River flows through Bonshaw, New South Wales and Yelarbon and Texas in Queensland. South of Texas, the Bruxner Highway crosses the Dumaresq River.

Within the river valley there are vineyards and numerous spots for fishing.  Farmers in the valley once supported the tobacco industry with crop near towns such as Texas.

In April 2011, the water hyacinth weed was found in the river system for the first time.

Etymology

The traditional custodians of the land surrounding the Dumaresq River are the indigenous Bigambul peoples, who called the river Karaula. The Kamilaroi people also have strong connections to the river.

The river was visited by European explorer and botanist, Allan Cunningham, in 1827 and named in honour of Lt-Colonel Henry Dumaresq, a relative of Ralph Darling, the Governor of New South Wales at that time. The river has an important role in the sustainability of livelihoods of people who live on and near its banks.

See also

Rivers of New South Wales
Rivers of Queensland

References

External links
 

Rivers of Queensland
Rivers of New South Wales
Murray-Darling basin
Darling Downs
Great Dividing Range
Northern Tablelands
Borders of New South Wales
Borders of Queensland